Jumelle Okoko (born 26 December 1984) is a Congolese handball player. She plays for the club Blavozy RB and for the DR Congo national team. She represented DR Congo at the 2013 World Women's Handball Championship in Serbia, where DR Congo placed 20th.

References

1984 births
Living people
Democratic Republic of the Congo female handball players
Expatriate handball players
Democratic Republic of the Congo expatriates in France
21st-century Democratic Republic of the Congo people